Marcelino Gálatas Rentería (2 April 1903 – 8 April 1994) was a Spanish international footballer born in the Philippines to a family of Basque origin, who moved to the Basque Country to study engineering and played for Athletic Bilbao, SD Deusto, Real Sociedad and Atlético Madrid. Nicknamed "Chelín", he only appeared in one international game for his country.

See also
Athletic Bilbao signing policy
List of Spain international footballers born outside Spain

References

External links
  Player profile

1903 births
1994 deaths
Spanish footballers
Spain international footballers
Filipino footballers
Filipino people of Spanish descent
Citizens of Spain through descent
Athletic Bilbao footballers
Atlético Madrid footballers
Real Sociedad footballers
Association football forwards
Filipino people of Basque descent
Filipino emigrants to Spain
SD Deusto players